BNS Nirbhoy was a Type 037-class submarine chaser of Bangladesh Navy. She served the Bangladesh Navy till 2022.

Career
BNS Nirbhoy was commissioned to Bangladesh Navy on 1 December 1985.

In November 2008, BNS Nirbhoy along with BNS Abu Bakr and BNS Madhumati intercepted Myanmar Navy ships at a disputed region of Bay of Bengal where they were supporting an exploration of oil and gas fields.

She was decommissioned from the Bangladesh Navy service on 19 January 2022.

Electronics
The ship used a Pot Head radar as primary electronics. It was a surface search radar which was effective in performing mine laying operations. For ASW operations, she used Chinese SJD-3 telescoping high frequency active sonar. Instead of being fixed to the hull, SJD-3 had a telescoping arm, so when not in use, the sonar was stored in the hull and when deployed, the sonar was lowered into water several meter below the hull, thus increased detection range by avoiding buffeting generated by the hull.

Armament
The primary armaments of the ship were two twin 57mm 70-cal Type 76 DP guns and two twin 25mm 60cal Type 61 guns. Besides these she carried a variety of weapons to perform  ASW missions.  The ASW weapons were four RBU-1200 (Type 81) (5-barrel) ASW rockets, two BMB-2 ASW mortars and two depth charge rails with 20 depth charges.

See also
List of active ships of the Bangladesh Navy
BNS Durjoy

References

Ships of the Bangladesh Navy
Submarine chasers of Bangladesh Navy